Belalie East is a rural locality in the Mid North region of South Australia. It is situated in the Northern Areas Council. The boundaries were formally established in April 2001 for the long established local name, relating to the cadastral Hundred of Belalie; however, the modern locality is divided between Belalie and the adjacent Hundred of Whyte.

The Wilkins Highway runs roughly diagonally through the centre of Belalie East, connecting Jamestown and Hallett.

The Belalie East school opened in 1878 and closed in 1959. The Belalie East Memorial Hall opened on 1 September 1923, and survives today. A Presbyterian church was built in 1881; its date of closure is unknown. It also formerly had its own coursing club. Belalie East has had three post offices: the first operated between 11 June 1873 and 2 May 1876, the second operated between 1 November 1883 and 31 March 1892 and the third operated between approximately 1896 and 1898.

The historic Coolootoo Shepherd's Hut, a remnant of the significant Old Canowie Station, is located on the boundary between Belalie East and its southern neighbour Mayfield, and is listed on the South Australian Heritage Register.

References

Towns in South Australia
Mid North (South Australia)